Utsav Bharat (formerly known as Star Bharat UK) is a European Hindi pay television channel owned by The Walt Disney Company India Subsidiary of The Walt Disney Company. the channel operated by Disney Star It telecasts family dramas, mythological, historical, crime, romantic and comedy shows. Its programming is in Hindi and automated subtitled in English.

History
In November 2006, Star One, along with Star Gold, launched in the UK on Sky. The channel was an Indian subscription-television youth channel that
 
Star One was rebranded as Star Life OK on May 2012. It was then rebranded again on 28 August 2017 as Star Bharat.

On 30 December 2020, Disney announced that the ‘Star’ branding would be replaced with ‘Utsav’ in 2021. This was done to avoid confusion with Disney's then upcoming service STAR on Disney+.

On 11 January 2021, Star TV UK/Europe revealed the new logo identity.

On 22 January 2021, Star Bharat rebranded to Utsav Bharat, and this change is currently effective in parts of UK/Europe.

Programming
The channel line-up consists of family dramas, mythological, historical, crime, romantic, comedy shows and television films. It also broadcast shows which are exclusive to Utsav Bharat viewers, Hindi Bollywood movies and movies dubbed in Hindi.

The channel Launched a programming block: Star Zaika.

The programming Of ‘Star Zaika’ consists of cooking shows which are aired during different times of the day on both Utsav Bharat and Utsav Plus.

Its programming is in Hindi and automated subtitles in English.

Current Broadcast
Utsav Bharat Originals

Utsav Bharat exclusives

References

Hindi-language television channels in India
Television stations in Mumbai
Television channels and stations established in 2021
Foreign television channels broadcasting in the United Kingdom
Disney Star